Dönemeç is a village in the Edremit district of Van Province in Turkey.

Name 
The village was originally called Engil, from the Armenian name of the village Anggh (variations include Ang, Angegh, and Anguyl), which literally means "vulture" in Armenian. The village was supposedly named this because of the large number of vultures living in the area. It was renamed Dönemeç during the republican era.

Geography 
Dönemeç is located 7 kilometers away from the coast of Lake Van, on the right bank of the Engil River, also called the Dönemeç or Hoşap River (historically known as the Khoshab or Anggh River in Armenian). The village is about 1660 to 1685 meters above sea level.

History 
The village was historically populated by Armenians and fell into the Hayots Dzor canton of the Vaspurakan province of historical Armenia. There are a number of ruined churches and monasteries in the area surrounding the village.

In 1872 a number of inhabitants of the village wrote a letter seeking to cooperate with the secret organization "Union for Salvation", which was founded in Van that same year and aimed at the betterment of conditions for Armenians, one of the first such Armenian political organizations. 

In 1877, the village fell victim to a raid by the Kurdish tribal leader Jalaleddin. Many of the villagers were killed during the Hamidian massacres. The village was periodically attacked and looted after 1896. Its population was approximately 495 at the beginning of the twentieth century, consisting mainly of Armenians and a few Kurds. During the Armenian genocide, most of the village's inhabitants were massacred, while a small number managed to flee and reach Eastern Armenia.

Since the Armenian genocide the village has been inhabited by Kurds.

Demographics

References 

Villages in Van Province